Harry Melvin Philpott (May 6, 1917 – January 28, 2008) was the President of Auburn University from 1965 to 1980.

Biography
Harry M. Philpott graduated from Washington and Lee University in 1938. He served as a chaplain in the United States Navy during World War II. In 1947, Philpott received a PhD from Yale University in religion and higher education. From 1947 to 1952, he taught at the University of Florida,  and from 1952 to 1957 he served as Dean of religious life at Stephens College. In addition, Harry M. Philpott was also the vice-president of the University of Florida from 1957 to 1965, but is most known for serving as the President of Auburn University from 1965 until 1980.

References

1917 births
2008 deaths
Washington and Lee University alumni
University of Florida faculty
Stephens College faculty
Presidents of Auburn University
Yale University alumni
United States Navy chaplains
World War II chaplains
People from Bassett, Virginia